Abd al-Majid Nimer Zaghmout (died 15 February 2000) was a Palestinian national imprisoned in Syria who was described by Amnesty International as "possibly the 
longest-serving arbitrarily detained political prisoner in the Middle East". At his death, he was arguably the longest-serving political prisoner in the world.

Prior to arrest 
He was formerly a member of Fatah, a mainstream faction of the Palestine Liberation Organization.

Arrest 
He was arrested in 1966 and charged with the politically motivated murder of the Palestinian guerrilla 
leader Yusuf 'Urabi. He denied the charges and alleged he had been tortured for 
46 days after his arrest to force him to confess.

Trial and conviction 
After a trial described in some quarters as "unfair"[web.amnesty.org/library/Index/ENGMDE240201998?open&of=ENG-348] he was sentenced to death by a military court.

Order for release 
The Syrian Minister of Defence, General Mustafa Tlass, in 1989 ordered his release, but the order was not carried out.<ref name="Amnes" /

Death 
He died of cancer in a military hospital on 15 February 2000.

References 

Year of birth missing
2000 deaths
Palestinian people imprisoned abroad
Prisoners and detainees of Syria